James "Jim" Currier  was an English-born footballer who played as a centre forward in the 1930s and 1940s.

He joined Bolton Wanderers from Cheltenham Town and first played in The Football League for Bolton in 1935–36, scoring 14 times in his 26 appearances.

During World War II he played for Manchester City on a number of occasions between 1940 and 1943, and he scored an impressive 94 goals in his 113 games for City.

References

Year of birth missing
Year of death missing
Sportspeople from Wednesbury
Cheltenham Town F.C. players
Bolton Wanderers F.C. players
Manchester City F.C. wartime guest players
English footballers
Association football forwards